The 1986 New Mexico gubernatorial election took place on November 4, 1986, in order to elect the governor of New Mexico. Due to term limits, incumbent Democratic governor Toney Anaya was ineligible to seek a second term as governor. This was the last time until 2022, that the state elected a governor of the same party as the sitting president.

Democratic primary

Republican primary
The Republican primary was won by former New Mexico Republican Party chair Garrey Carruthers, who defeated five other candidates.

Results

General election

Results

References

1986
gubernatorial
New Mexico